Human mammary tumor virus (HMTV) is a B-type retrovirus that is closely related to the mouse mammary tumor virus (MMTV). The existence of this virus was suspected for decades but nucleotide sequences identifying a unique virus in human breast cancer tumors were not confirmed until 2001. Viral particles were isolated several years later. Evidence for a role of HTMV/MMTV in human breast cancer has recently been reviewed.

References

Betaretroviruses